The Brilliant Mind of Edison Lee is a comic strip created by John Hambrock and distributed by King Features Syndicate. It debuted November 12, 2006. While this strip is about a ten-year-old boy genius, Edison Lee, it also has aspects of an editorial cartoon since Edison constantly talks about the US political, and economic situation. In March 2010, the strip was nominated for the National Cartoonists Society's division award in the category Newspaper Comic Strip, along with Zits and Non Sequitur.

Characters and story
The strip stars Edison Lee, his family and his friend and assistant, a talking rat. The only regularly appearing secondary character is a U.S. Senator   in political strips.   Other secondary characters occur at such places as the fast food restaurant, the supermarket, and the hospital.

Edison Lee
Edison Lee is an extremely smart ten-year-old who is obsessed with US politics. He creates inventions which directly relate to the current state of affairs in the US.

Don Lee
Don is Edison’s father. While flummoxed at times about Edison's musings, he does react firmly when Edison makes unlikely demands.

Carol Lee
Carol is Edison's mother. She is an educator and is the stable member of the family.

Orville Lee
Orville, Edison’s paternal grandfather, is retired. He loves to eat junk food and watch TV. Any mention of healthy food and good health in general falls on deaf ears.

Joules
Joules is Edison’s lab assistant, a talking rat. He only appears when Edison is conjuring up a new invention, board game or scheme in his laboratory.

Style
The daily strip usually runs to four panels, with three panels appearing on some occasions. The Sunday strip is in a two-tiered format with a large throwaway logo panel appearing on the left. It is drawn in great detail and appears in color (online and in newspapers that carry daily color strips). Objects like computers, cars and other props required in a cartoon strip are presented as close to reality as possible. While much of the characters' lives takes place inside their house, they are frequently shown outside, gazing at the heavens or traveling into the woods. They are also shown shopping at a mall, buying medicines at a pharmacy and visiting the doctor.

There is very little serialization as in strips like Retail or Sherman's Lagoon where the story usually runs for a week or more. In The Brilliant Mind of Edison Lee the story generally runs on a day-to-day basis with some exceptions.

References

External links
Brilliant Mind of Edison Lee at King Features
The Brilliant Mind of Edison Lee

American comic strips
2006 comics debuts
Satirical comics
Gag-a-day comics
Male characters in comics
Child characters in comics